Abdel-Halim Caracalla is the founder and the artistic director of the Lebanese dance company Caracalla Dance Theatre, a company which would evolve into the first and most prominent dance theatre of the Middle East, creating a new language based upon the disciplines of western technique intertwined with the identity, movement and traditions of Arab cultural heritage.  	

Since 1968 Caracalla created over twenty ballets and musicals including adaptations of Shakespeare’s A Midsummer Night’s Dream, Taming of the Shrew and Much Ado About Nothing.

Recipient of numerous acclaimed awards the Caracalla Dance Theatre captured global press recognition and collaborates with internationally renowned artists, pioneers in the world of the performing arts. The company has succeeded in establishing its own theatre in Beirut, which is home to the leading Caracalla Dance School. Caracalla also has extensive archival research in dance, music, literature, costumes and traditions, consolidating its rich heritage as it celebrates its landmark 50th anniversary.

Early life

Abdel Halim Caracalla was born in 1940 in Heliopolis – City of the Sun – one of the most formidable ancient Roman cities of the world, where the temples of Jupiter, Bacchus and Venus, stand majestically in the Bekaa valley of Lebanon.
Heliopolis, known today as Baalbeck, is where Caracalla spent his childhood inspired by these temples and grew to become the pole vaulting champion of Lebanon and the Arab world under the commanding upbringing of his Greek coach who installed in him the Spartan spirit. 
Baalbeck was also home to the renowned International Arts Festival which attracted the most famous artists from around the world. Inspired by the dance companies which were performing every summer in front of the Roman temples, Caracalla was mesmerized by the skill of the dancers and their ability to move with such grace and perfection. It wasn’t long thereafter that Caracalla, at the height of his athletic ability, hung up his sports attire and followed the call of his destiny.

For a young man from Lebanon and the Arab world, let alone from Baalbeck, to embark in the early 60s in search of learning how to dance, was an unthinkable career frowned upon. Against the wishes of his family and against all odds, Caracalla embarked in pursuit of his ambitions and dreams, challenging time and era, home and country, and made his way to London to discover the world of dance.

In a twist of fate, Caracalla became student at the London School of Contemporary Dance where he received his Master’s in Choreography under none other than Martha Graham, who forever would leave her mark on the young apprentice.

Career
In 1968, he went on to found the Caracalla Dance Theatre, a company which would evolve into the first and most prominent dance theatre of the Middle East, creating a new language based upon the disciplines of western technique intertwined with the identity, movement and traditions of Arab cultural heritage.

Throughout the fifty years, Abdel Halim Caracalla maintained his artistic message with worldwide performances from the Osaka Fair Japan to the Kennedy Centre and Carnegie Hall in the United States, Sadler's Wells and the English National Opera in London, Théâtre des Champs Elysées and Palais des Congrès in Paris, Lenin Palace in Leningrad, Sao Paolo and Rio de Janeiro Opera Houses, Frankfurt Opera House, the National Centre for the Performing Arts Beijing as well as other reputable venues throughout the Middle East, Africa, the Far East, Northern and Southern America.

Since 1968 Caracalla created over twenty ballets and musicals, some adapted from Shakespeare, others inspired by history, legends and tradition.
Having performed at the most reputable theatres and cultural cities across the world, Caracalla captured global press recognition along with the admiration of a vast audience. He collaborated with internationally renowned artists pioneers in the world of theatre such as the legendary Maestro Franco Zeffirelli, Italian scenographer Ezio Frigerio, avant-garde director Hugo de Ana, video director Sergio Metalli, lighting designer Vinicio Cheli, set designer Giuliano Spinelli and the list goes on.

Caracalla is viewed by many as the guardian of culture and heritage of the Arab world and has promoted the arts and culture from the Middle East in an unprecedented way. His achievements have been celebrated by various cultural foundations, heads of states, kings and emirs, honoring him with an array of awards and recognitions.

Awards & Recognitions

The Caracalla Dance Theatre, Mr. Abdel Halim Caracalla founder of the Caracalla Dance Theatre, and Mr. Ivan Caracalla director of the Caracalla Dance Theatre, have won several awards and recognitions worldwide and captured global press attention interpreted through an original dance form and revealing a rich and mysterious east blended with western technique.

Presidential awards
 President Elias Hraoui of Lebanon
 President Emile Lahoud of Lebanon
 President Ben Ali of Tunisia 
 President Ben Bella of Algeria
 President Bou Taflika of Algeria
 President Sulaiman of Lebanon
 President Khalifa bin Zayed Al Nahyan – United Arab Emirates

Presidential recognitions
 Empress Farah Diba of Persia
 King Hussain of Jordan 
 President Franjieh of Lebanon
 Prince Mikaza of Japan 
 President Borgiba of Tunisia 
 President Amin Gemayel of Lebanon
 Sheikha Moza of Qatar

Recognitions
 Key of Los Angeles
 Key of Las Vegas 
 Royal Shakespeare Association UK
 Prime Minister Hariri of Lebanon

Awards
 Said Akl decoration
 Beirut International Awards Festival 
 Antonin University 
 Elias Hraoui Outstanding Achievements
 Murex D’or 
 Notre Dame University
 Bipod Contemporary Dance Festival

References

Lebanese theatre directors
Living people
1940 births